Camilo Andrés Ayala Quintero (born 23 June 1986) is a Colombian footballer who plays for Deportivo Pasto in the Categoría Primera A.

He is a defensive midfielder but also can play as winger.

External links
 

1986 births
Living people
Colombian footballers
Colombian expatriate footballers
Categoría Primera A players
Categoría Primera B players
Chilean Primera División players
La Equidad footballers
Atlético Huila footballers
Deportivo Cali footballers
América de Cali footballers
San Marcos de Arica footballers
Águilas Doradas Rionegro players
Alianza Petrolera players
Deportivo Pasto footballers
Footballers from Medellín
Association football midfielders
Expatriate footballers in Chile
Colombian expatriate sportspeople in Chile